George Thompson Broughton (January 7, 1888 – August 5, 1956) was a Canadian professional ice hockey player. He played as a goaltender with the Montreal Shamrocks (1910) and Montreal Wanderers (1911–12) of the National Hockey Association.

He is buried at Mount Royal Cemetery in Montreal.

References

External links
George Broughton at JustSportsStats

1888 births
1956 deaths
Canadian ice hockey goaltenders
Montreal Shamrocks players
Montreal Wanderers (NHA) players